Neetzow-Liepen is a municipality in the Vorpommern-Greifswald district, in Mecklenburg-Vorpommern, Germany. It was formed on 1 January 2014 by the merger of the former municipalities Neetzow and Liepen.

References

External links

Vorpommern-Greifswald